Ktiv menuqad (literally "writing with niqqud") is text in Hebrew supplemented with niqqud diacritics. In modern Israeli orthography niqqud is seldom used, except in specialised texts such as dictionaries, poetry, or texts for children or for new immigrants.

An example of ktiv menuqad is a tikkun, a book in which the text of the Torah appears in two side-by-side versions, one identical to the text which appears in the Torah (which uses ktiv haser), and one with niqqud and cantillation.

See also
Hebrew alphabet
Academy of the Hebrew Language
Hebrew spelling
Ktiv male
Ktiv haser

Hebrew grammar

ar:تسطير عبري#كتيب منقد